"Wings" (Krylya) is a song by Russian child singer Polina Bogusevich. It represented Russia in the Junior Eurovision Song Contest 2017 and won the competition.

References

Junior Eurovision Song Contest winning songs
2017 singles
2017 songs